Acanthoderini is a tribe of longhorn beetles of the subfamily Lamiinae. It was described by Thomson in 1860.

Taxonomy

 Acakyra
 Acanthoderes
 Aegomorphus Haldeman, 1847
 Aegoschema
 Alphus
 Amblysaphes
 Anasillus
 Anoreina
 Ateralphus
 Azygocera
 Berningerus
 Callapoecoides
 Catuana
 Cosmotomidius
 Cotycicuiara
 Cotyzineus
 Criopsis
 Discopus
 Dryoctenes
 Dufauxia
 Eupromerella
 Exalphus
 Formozotroctes
 Grandateralphus
 Hedypathes
 Irundisaua
 Itajutinga
 Macronemus
 Melzerus
 Meridiotroctes
 Miguelmonneus
 Miriochrus
 Mundeu
 Myoxinus
 Myoxomorpha
 Necalphus
 Nesozineus
 Noxnympha
 Octotapnia
 Oplosia Mulsant, 1863
 Ozotroctes
 Paracanista
 Paradiscopus
 Parapolyacanthia
 Penaherreraus
 Peritapnia Horn, 1894
 Plagiosarus
 Plistonax
 Psapharoctes
 Pseudaethomerus
 Pseudotapnia
 Pteridotelus
 Punctozotroctes
 Pycnomorphidiellus
 Pyrianoreina
 Scleronotus
 Scythropopsis
 Sorelia
 Spinozotroctes
 Steirastoma Lepeletier and Audinet-Serville in Lacordaire, 1830
 Sychnomerus
 Symperasmus
 Taurorcus
 Tetrasarus
 Trichoanoreina
 Urangaua
 Wappesicus
 Zikanita

References

 
Lamiinae